Jeneration (Chinese: J世紀) is a greatest hits album by Taiwanese singer Jolin Tsai. It was released on February 27, 2009, by Gold Typhoon and Mars. It contains her 27 songs previously released by EMI and three previously unreleased songs.

Background and release 
On February 16, 2006, Tsai signed a recording contract with EMI, through which she later released two studio albums—Dancing Diva (2006) and Agent J (2007), the two albums have sold more than 2.5 million and 3 million in Asia, respectively. In Taiwan, the two albums have sold more than 300,000 and 200,000 copies, respectively, and each of them became the highest-selling album overall in their respective years of release. On March 26, 2008, it was revealed that EMI would end the business in Asia after Easter of the year. On August 3, 2008, Norman Cheng, the former president of EMI Asia, announced that he would acquire all the shares of EMI Great China, including Taiwan's EMI, Hong Kong's Gold Label, and China's Push Typhoon, and these three companies would be merged into a new company named Gold Typhoon.

On December 16, 2008, Tsai signed a recording contract with Warner. On February 19, 2009, Gold Typhoon announced that they would release for Tsai a greatest hits album, and it would include 27 songs released during EMI and three previously unreleased songs—"Hauteur", "Run Run", and "Habitual Betrayal". On the same date, it was revealed that Gold Typhoon planned to release a greatest hits album together with Sony, but this plan was cancelled due to copyright and profit sharing issues. The album debuted at number two, number two, and number five on the weekly record charts of Five Music, G-Music, and Chia Chia in Taiwan, respectively.

Critical reception 
Hong Kong Economic Times wrote: "In terms of new songs, both 'Hauteur' and 'Run Run' are electropop songs, but they sound not outstanding. The ballad 'Habitual Betrayal' merged minor scale element, and it sounds not bad. Among her old songs, both 'Dancing Diva' and 'Agent J' are representative works of Tsai's dance songs, which had also established her diva status. In fact, she also has a lot of good ballads, such as 'Pretence' and other hits. This album also includes her covers of Sandy Lam's 'Heard That Love's Ever Been Back' and Faye Wong's 'Missing', showing Tsai's diverse singing style."

Tencent Entertainment wrote: "The three new songs are highlights of the album, although there is nothing new in style, they can even be regarded as remainder of her Gold Typhoon period, but for her fans, the album has a lot of collection value."

Track listing

Release history

References

External links 
 

2009 greatest hits albums
Gold Typhoon Taiwan albums
Jolin Tsai compilation albums